Louis I (25 July 1642, in Prince's Palace of Monaco – 3 January 1701, in Rome) was Prince of Monaco from 1662 until 1701.

Louis Grimaldi was the elder son of Prince Hercule of Monaco and Maria Aurelia Spinola.

Louis married Catherine Charlotte de Gramont, daughter of Marshal Antoine III de Gramont, on 30 March 1660 in Pau.

They had six children:
Antoine Grimaldi (1661–1731), his successor.
Maria Teresa Carlotta Grimaldi (14 June 1662 – 1738), a Visitandine nun at Monaco.
Anna Hippolyte Grimaldi (1667 – 23 July 1700), married (1696) Jacques de Crussol, Duc d'Uzès (29 December 1675, Paris – 19 July 1739, Uzès castle).
François Honoré  Grimaldi (21 December 1669 – 18 February 1748, Paris), Archbishop of Besançon
Jeanne Maria Grimaldi, a Visitandine nun at Monaco, later coadjutrice of the Abbey of Royallieu near Compiègne.
Aurelia Grimaldi, called mademoiselle de Baux.

In 1662, Louis succeeded his grandfather Honoré II as Prince of Monaco.  In 1666 he distinguished himself at the Four Days' Battle between the English and Dutch fleets.  On 5 July 1668 he took the oath to King Louis XIV of France in the Parlement on account of being Duke of Valentinois and a Peer of France.  He was made a knight of the French royal orders on 31 December 1688.

In 1699, Louis XIV sent Louis to Rome as ambassador extraordinary. There on 19 December he presented the insignia of the Order of the Holy Spirit to James Louis and Alexander Benedict Sobieski, the two sons of King John III of Poland.  Louis remained in Rome, where he died 3 January 1701. His remains were transported back to Monaco.

Ancestors

1642 births
1701 deaths
17th-century Princes of Monaco
18th-century Princes of Monaco
17th-century peers of France
18th-century peers of France
Burials at the Cathedral of Our Lady Immaculate
Dukes of Valentinois
Hereditary Princes of Monaco
House of Grimaldi
Marquesses of Baux
Monegasque princes
People from Campagna
Princes of Monaco